Justice Bhushan Ramkrishna Gavai (born on 24 November 1960)is a judge of Supreme Court of India. He is former judge of the Bombay High Court. He is the chancellor of Maharashtra National Law University, Nagpur. He is set to become the 52nd chief justice of India if the seniority convention is followed.

Personal life
Ramakrishan Bhushan Gavai was born to R.S. Gavai and Kamala. His father led the Republican Party of India (Gavai) faction, former M.P and governor. His brother Rajendra Gavai is also a politician. His family is inspired by B. R. Ambedkar and follow Buddhism.

Early life and career

Gavai was born on 24 November 1960 at Amravati and joined the bar on 16 March 1985. He worked with Bar. Raja S. Bhonsale, former advocate general and judge of the High Court. He practiced independently at Bombay High Court from 1987 to 1990. After 1990, he practised mainly before Nagpur Bench of Bombay High Court. He also practised in constitutional law and administrative law. 

He was standing counsel for municipal corporation of Nagpur, Amravati Municipal Corporation and Amravati University. Appeared regularly for various autonomous bodies and corporations like SICOM, DCVL etc. and various municipal councils in Vidarbha region.

He was appointed as assistant government pleader and additional public prosecutor in the High Court of Judicature at Bombay, Nagpur Bench, from August 1992 to July 1993. Later, he was appointed as government pleader and public prosecutor for Nagpur Bench on 17 January 2000. He was elevated as additional judge of the High Court on 14 November 2003.

References

External links
JUSTICE Bhushan Ramkrishna Gavai Official Profile from Bombay High court website

1960 births
Living people
Place of birth missing (living people)
20th-century Buddhists
20th-century Indian judges
21st-century Buddhists
21st-century Indian judges
Dalit people
Judges of the Bombay High Court
Indian Buddhists
[[Category:Justices of the Supreme Court of India]